Sengkang Bus Interchange is a bus interchange located on the ground level of Compass Heights condominium in the town centre of Sengkang New Town, Singapore. Located next to Sengkang MRT/LRT station, it is the second bus interchange in Singapore to be air conditioned. It was opened on 18 January 2003.

History

Old bus interchange
The bus interchange was opened on 12 June 1998 as a terminal. At that time, developments around the area in Sengkang New Town were still actively in progress. On 28 April 2001, the temporary bus interchange was located across the road of Sengkang Square. To date, only the main shelter of the old bus interchange remains, connecting Sengkang Square to nearby HDB estates along Compassvale Road.

Relocation
On 18 January 2003, which was the day Sengkang LRT East Loop opened, Sengkang Bus Interchange was moved to Compass One (formerly known as Compass Point), and integrated with the other transport networks like the Sengkang MRT, Sengkang LRT line and station, all housed under one complex. It is notably the second bus interchange in Singapore to be air-conditioned, after Toa Payoh Bus Interchange.

Enhancement
To improve ventilation at the former non-air conditioned alighting bays, the Land Transport Authority constructed a new air-conditioned passageway connecting to the existing air conditioned boarding areas in 2007. On 24 November 2014, LTA officially announced the expansion of the interchange to accommodate future bus services under the Bus Service Enhancement Programme (BSEP) Scheme as the current interchange does not have enough parking spaces for more services. The expansion consists of 12 additional parking bays, boarding and alighting facilities, concourse area, staff lounge and a canteen. The expansion works were scheduled to be completed in the third quarter of 2016. The extension, named Compassvale Bus Interchange (formerly referred to as Sengkang Bus Interchange Expansion), is located opposite the current bus interchange along Sengkang Square and it officially opened on 12 March 2017 together with the launch of bus service 374.

Bus Contracting Model

Under the new bus contracting model, all the bus routes were split into 4 route packages. Bus Service 965 is under Sembawang-Yishun Bus Package, Bus Service 83 is under Loyang Bus Package, Bus Service 156 is under Clementi Bus Package and the rest of the bus services are under Sengkang-Hougang Bus Package.

Currently, Bus Service 83 (Loyang Bus Package) is operated by Go-Ahead Singapore. Bus Service 965 (Sembawang-Yishun Bus Package) is currently operated by Tower Transit Singapore. All remaining bus services are operated by the anchor operator, SBS Transit.

List of routes

References

External links
 Interchanges and Terminals (SBS Transit)
 Interchange/Terminal (SMRT Buses)

2003 establishments in Singapore
Bus stations in Singapore
Buildings and structures in Sengkang
Transport in North-East Region, Singapore
Sengkang
Sengkang Town Centre